Nanji is a surname. Notable people with the surname include:

Azim Nanji, Kenyan-born professor of Islamic studies
Shenaaz Nanji (born 1954), Indian Canadian children's and young adult author

See also
Nanaji